In computing, a stanza consists of a related group of lines in a script or configuration file.
Formats depend on context.

See also
 XML stanza

References 

Computer programming